The CZ 807 is a Czech modular dual-calibre assault rifle originally developed by Česká zbrojovka Uherský Brod for the Indian Armed Forces. The modular design of rifle allows operators to quickly change calibre of weapon to either 5.56×45 mm or 7.62×39 mm. The rifle was announced by the company in 2013 at an event in Liberec. However, in June 2015, the Indian tender was scrapped.

Description
The CZ 807 is derived from the CZ 805 BREN series of rifles. The basic characteristics of the rifle are that it is a piston operated, gas-driven select-fire rifle of dual calibres. The ambidextrous charging handle is easy to change sides on. It has a modular design, with an aluminium alloy upper receiver and polymer lower receiver/fire control group. The bolt is a multi-lug type riding in a bolt carrier, locking into a barrel extension. The system is balanced well, and designed to meet the most rigorous requirements.

The materials used are fire-resistant, impact-resistant, and damage-resistant. The controls are accessible from both sides. Other characteristics include folding telescopic stock and interchangeable backstraps in three sizes.

Calibre Conversion
Changing calibre of CZ 807 assault rifle is simple: the barrel assembly, bolt and firing pin, and the magazine are changed out in a field safe operation at the unit level. The trigger group of the CZ 807 has a magazine well that is for the 7.62×39 mm magazines. To convert to 5.56×45 mm, the only item needed for the lower (Trigger group) is the magazine well insert.

Variants 
The CZ 807 is available in two calibers:

7.62×39mm CZ 807 Assault Rifle 
Barrel Length: 408mm
Bore grooves: 4
Rifling Twist: RH 240:1mm
Overall length: 833–927 mm 
Width: 78/102 mm 
Frame: Light alloy 
Rate of Fire (appr): 810 rpm
Effective range: 350 metres
Magazine capacity: 30 round
Rifle weight (no mag): 3.15 kg 
5.56×45mm NATO CZ 807 Assault Rifle 
Barrel Length: 408mm
Bore grooves: 6
Rifling Twist: RH 178:1mm
Length of rifle: 904mm (W stock extended), 857mm (W stock retracted), 692mm (W stock folded)
Rate of Fire (appr): 810 rpm
Effective range: 450 metres
Magazine capacity: 30 round
Rifle weight (no mag): 3.41 kg

Users 
: 7.62x39mm variant used by GIGN
: Used by Ghana Police National Protection Unit (NPU) and Counter Terrorism Unit (CTU)
: Used by Various State Police STF's 
: Used by Ukrainian military
: Paratroopers and presidential guard

Potential users 
: CZ 807 was one of the three finalists in the Pakistan Army competition to replace Heckler & Koch G3 and Type 56 rifles. In November 2016, Ceska Zbrojovka and Pakistan Ordnance Factories signed a Letter of Understanding (LoU) to "intensively negotiate a delivery of complete technology for the production of small arms to Pakistan Ordnance Factories, POF. Mutual interest refers to gradual launching of production in Pakistan, ranging from light assembly to maximum localization of production. Within this cooperation, transfer of technology as well as technical support including technical training of the personnel for Pakistan Ordnance Factories is expected." https://twitter.com/Jakepor21/status/1451485285540405254

In March 2017, during a marketing demonstration to local law-enforcement agencies in Quetta, Balochistan, a Česká zbrojovka official stated that: "Recently we have signed a letter-of-understanding with POF, and we are ready to transfer, the full transfer (sic) of modern technology from CZ to Pakistan, to POF, so we can produce the most modern and most advanced assault rifles in the world at POF." CZ 807 assault rifles, Scorpion Evo 3 sub-machine guns, and P-series pistols were showcased at the event which was also attended by Pakistan Army officials. https://twitter.com/Jakepor21/status/1451485285540405254

See also 
CZ 805 BREN

References

External links 
 CZ official web site
 Pakistan's Service Rifle (G-3, Type-56) Replacement Competition 2016.

7.62×39mm assault rifles